Pačir is a village located in the municipality of Bačka Topola, Serbia. As of 2011 census, the village has 2,580 inhabitants, with Hungarians having the ethnic majority.

Demographics

As of 2011 census, the village of Pačir has 2,580 inhabitants.

Ethnic groups
The ethnic composition of the village (as of 2002 census):

See also 
 List of places in Serbia
 List of cities, towns and villages in Vojvodina

References 

 Slobodan Ćurčić, Broj stanovnika Vojvodine, Novi Sad, 1996.

External links 

 
 History of Pačir 

Places in Bačka
Populated places in North Bačka District
Hungarian communities in Serbia